McErlane is a surname. Notable people with the surname include:

Frank McErlane (1894–1932), American Prohibition-era gangster
Maria McErlane (born 1957), British actor and comedian